Lago Nero is a lake in the Province of Bergamo, Lombardy, Italy. At an elevation of 2014 m, its surface area is 0.16 km².

Lakes of Lombardy